Attila Kornis (born 17 May 1989 in Budapest) is a Hungarian football player who currently plays for MTK Hungária FC.

References
MLSZ 
HLSZ 

1989 births
Living people
Footballers from Budapest
Hungarian footballers
Association football defenders
MTK Budapest FC players
Vasas SC players
Rákospalotai EAC footballers
Szigetszentmiklósi TK footballers
Nemzeti Bajnokság I players